Bristol and West Building Society v Mothew [1996] EWCA Civ 533 is a leading English fiduciary law and professional negligence case, concerning a solicitor's duty of care and skill, and the nature of fiduciary duties. The case is globally cited for its definition of a fiduciary and the circumstances in which a fiduciary relationship arises.

Facts
Mr Mothew was a solicitor who had acted for both borrower and lender in a mortgage transaction relating to the purchase of a residential property. It was alleged that he negligently told the building society that there was no second charge on the house when the mortgage agreement was signed. At the time of reporting to the building society and requesting its funding, unbeknown to Mr Mothew, the borrower had a relatively small bank overdraft facility limited to £2,000. After completion of the purchase and mortgage (at which time the lender's funds were applied to the transaction) but before the transactions were registered at Land Registry Mr Mothew was approached by the borrower's bankers [Barclays] to say that they were granting a second mortgage facility to the borrower and seeking that their second charge be registered at Land Registry. The second charge documentation had been prepared and executed by the borrower at the bank's premises. By registering the second charge documentation contemporaneously with the purchase and (first) mortgage there was a waiver of fees payable to the Land Registry thereby saving expense for the borrower than if the second charge had been registered separately later. The Cheshunt Building Society were asked by Mr Mothew to consent to registration of the second charge which they did and they were also given formal notice of the second charge which they acknowledged. Mr Mothew delayed sending the application to the registry whilst the lender's consent was being obtained since it was also required to be lodged at the Land Registry. At the time of their default the borrower's overdraft facility had risen from £2,000 to £3,350. The housing market collapsed, and the homeowners (having lost their employment in the recession) defaulted on their mortgage with the building society. To realise their money, the building society had the property sold off for £53,000 in February 1991, a considerable time after they had taken possession of it. The lender claimed that if it had known of the borrower's overdraft facility, it would not have granted its mortgage to the borrower. They sued Mothew for the sum they lent (£59,000) less the proceeds of the sale.

Mothew argued that Bristol and West had been aware of the second charge and even if it had not known, it would still have proceeded with the transaction and suffered the same loss, because in 1988 when the transaction was going through, the market was buoyant and the extent of the borrower's overdraft facility was commonplace. This would mean no damages would be recoverable at common law, for there would be no causal connection with Mothew's (alleged) negligence and the building society's loss. At first instance he was unsuccessful. However his professional indemnity insurers took the matter to the Court of Appeal where three judges unanimously supported Mr Mothew (see Judgment below) and the case was referred back, ultimately resulting in a settlement whereby no penalty or payment was required to be paid by Mr Mothew or his insurers. Bristol and West ended up having to make a contribution in the region of eighty thousand pounds (£80,000) to the costs of Mr Mothew's indemnity insurers. This case is important because the Court of Appeal set out authority (a case with establishing a precedent) for a solicitors "fiduciary duty" to a lender in the application of funds drawn down by the solicitor irrespective of negligence being established. It has never in this particular case established any negligence, default or breach of duty of care by Mr. Mothew.

Judgment
Millett LJ allowed Mothew's appeal, and held that a causal link needed to be established. Just because the solicitor himself had fiduciary duties to his clients, that did not mean that every breach of duty of care was a breach of a fiduciary duty. When considering breaches of trust, causation need not be demonstrated, since these are concerned with acts of bad faith or breaches of the duty of loyalty that result in restitutionary damages. The building society had been fully informed and had consented to Mothew's course of action, which broke the causal link.

Also, a claim for breach of trust was not accepted, because Mothew's misrepresentations did not lead him outside his authority to apply the mortgage money. At p. 16-18 Millett LJ gave a summary of the relevant law.

Staughton LJ and Otton LJ agreed.

See also
English tort law
Trust law
Henderson v Merrett Syndicates Ltd [1994] 2 AC 145, 205, per Lord Browne-Wilkinson

Notes

References
S Elliot, 'Fiduciary Liability for Client Mortgage Frauds' (1999) 13 Trust Law International 74, 79
P Birks, ‘The Content of Fiduciary Obligation’ (2000) 34 Israel Law Journal 3, 32; (2002) 16 Trust Law International 34

English tort case law
English trusts case law
Court of Appeal (England and Wales) cases
1996 in case law
1996 in British law